Efren Ongpin Reyes Sr. (June 18, 1924 – February 11, 1968) was a Filipino actor and director. He was the father of Efren Reyes Jr.

Early life
Efren Ongpin Reyes Sr. was a popular action star of the 50s appearing mostly in action and costume epic movies. He was born on June 18, 1924, in Manila. Efren's grandfather was the celebrated Lola Basyang author, Severino Reyes, also the author and producer of Walang Sugat, the most popular of local Zarzuelas. He started his career at an early age doing supporting roles in such movies as Hiram na Pangalan (1948) and Wala na akong Luha (1948). Kumander Sundang (1949) was his first break and biggest hit. He became Premiere Productions' top contract star turning in memorable performances in Kapitan Bagwis (1951), Kapitan Berong (1953), Paltik (1954), Abenturera (1954), Pedro Penduko (1954), Ander Di Saya (1954), Mag-asawa'y di Biro (1954), Ifugao (1954), where he was awarded the Asian Film Festival Best Actor Award in 1955 and Kadenang Putik (1960), where he won the FAMAS Best Actor award. Two of his movies, Salabusab (1954) and Kalibre 45 (1957) were adjudged Famas Best Pictures. Known for his fencing skills, he appeared in many swashbuckling movies--- Prinsipe Don Juan (1950), Carlos Trece (1953), Prinsipe Villarba (1956), Haring Espada (1956), Prinsipe Alejandre (1957) and Eskrimador (1957). His sword duels with Johnny Monteiro in many movies they made together were a big treat to their legions of fans.

Reyes, according to his son, Efren Jr. in a recent article, pioneered the so-call Pinoy Western in Philippine movies, when his dad did Bandido in 1950. His colleagues then were reluctant and were not sold to the idea of doing the said movie because they saw it unrealistic as there were no cowboys in this country. The movie later turned out to be a big box-office hit that started the western genre in Philippine cinema.

He was also into film directing. His first directorial job was Haring Espada in 1956 using the pen name of Severino Reyes III. He likewise excelled in this field, gaining wide recognition and being nominated several times--- for Albano Brothers (1962), Sigaw ng Digmaan (1963), Pilipinas Kong Mahal (1965) and Dugo ang Kulay ng Pag-ibig (1966) He directed the legendary Fernando Poe Jr. in many memorable movies, among them, Sigaw ng Digmaan (1963), which won the Famas Best Picture that year, Ito ang Maynila (1963), Daniel Barrion (1964), Baril na Ginto (1964), Ang Daigdig Ko'y Ikaw (1965), Pilipinas Kong Mahal (1965), Zamboanga (1966).

Personal life
Efren Sr. was married to Primitiva Reyes, April 1, 1944. They had three children together, Reynaldo (1945–1951, Congenital Polio Meningitis), Winifrida (1948), and Efren Jr. (1950–1981)

He later married actress Virginia Montes. They had six children. Two of them, Cristina Reyes and Efren Jr. (son of Virginia), followed their footsteps.

Death
"When he died on Feb. 11, 1968, his coffin was placed atop the roof of Mount Carmel Church just to accommodate the throng of fans who wanted to pay their respects," said Efren. "And when he was being brought to his resting place, his friends carried his coffin from Mount Carmel to Loyola in Marikina."

"I only have fragments of his memories because he died when I was six. I only remembered the instances when all of us, the children, would enter his room in the morning to ask for baon. Ang gagawin n'ya, dudukutan n'ya mommy namin, para ibigay sa amin. ….Hindi n'ya ako napalo pero nataasan ako ng boses. Dun palang nanginig na ako (What he does, he snatches [money] from my mother, to give it to us. ...He never spanked me but he raised his voice once. That went me trembling)….. He used to bring us to Arcegas, here in Aurora Boulevard. There was a big toy store there. Pagdating ko doon, ang ligaya ko (When I got there, oh what a joy)."

Filmography

Movie Actor
Bulalakaw (1948)
Kumander Sundang (1949)
Alamat ng Perlas na Itim (1949)
Bakit Ako Luluha? (1949)
Halik sa Bandila (1949)
Kay Ganda ng Umaga (1949)
Dugo ng Katipunan (1949)
Hindi Ako Susuko (1949)
Ang Kampana ng San Diego (1950)
Santa Cristina (1951)
Ang Sawa sa Lumang Simboryo (1952)
Kapitan Berong (1953)
Carlos Trece (1953)
Salabusab (1954)
Pedro Penduko (1954)
Ifugao (1954) Lutab
Eskrimador (1955)
Desperado (1956)
Prinsipe Villarba (1956)
Kalibre .45 (1957)
Ramadal (1958)
Obra Maestra (1958)
Sa Ngalan ng Espada (1958)
Ang Maton (1959)
The Scavengers (1959) Puan
Kadenang putik (1960)
Hong Kong Honeymmon (1960)
Basta Pinoy (1960)
Baril sa Baril (1961)
Alaala Kita (1961)
Ako'y Alipin ng Opio (1961)
Pitong Sagisag (1961)
Apat na Kilabot (1962)
Sarah Sollente (1962)
Apat na Agimat (1962)
Cuatro Condenados (1962)
Ang Asawa Kong Barat (1963)
The Raiders of Leyte Gulf (1963) Capt. Shirai Akira
Dugo ang Kulay ng Pag-Ibig (1966)
Hangganan ng Matatapang (1967)

Movie Director
Ramadal (1958)
Obra Maestra (1958)
Sa Ngalan ng Espada (1958)
Singing Idol (1958)
Pitong Gatang (1959)
Basta Pinoy (1960)
Awat na Adyang (1961)
Ako'y Alipin ng Opio (1961)
Pitong Sagisag (1961)
Batang Maynila (1962)
Apat na Kilabot (1962)
Apat na Agimat (1962)
Albano Brothers (1962)
Panginoon (1962)
Cuatro Condenados (1962)
Sugapa (1963)
Sigaw ng Digmaan (1963)
Kung Gabi sa Maynila (1963)
Ito ang Maynila (1963)
Ang Babaeng Isputnik (1963)
Ang Asawa Kong Barat (1963)
Kung Hindi Ka Susuko...! (1963)
Ang Sangano at Colegiala (1963)
Baril na Ginto (1964)
Swanie (1965)
Pilipinas Kong Mahal (1965)
Ang Daigdig Ko'y Ikaw (1965)
Zamboanga (1966)
Dugo ang Kulay ng Pag-Ibig (1966)
Dakilang Balatkayo (1966)
Itinakwil Man Kita (1966)
The Jukebox Queen (1966)
Kardong Pusa (1968)
Jingy (1968)
Ang Dayuhan (1968)
Alyas 1 2 3 (1968)

Movie Writer
Singing Idol (1958; story)
Pitong Gatang (1959; screenplay)
Basta Pinoy (1960; screenplay and story)
Pitong Sagisag (1961; screenplay)
Albano Brothers (1962; screenplay)
Cuatro Condenados (1962; written by)
Kung Gabi sa Maynila (1963; story)
Ang Babaeng Isputnik (1963; story)
Ang Asawa Kong Barat (1963; story)
Kung Hindi Ka Susuko...! (1963; story)
Ang Sangano at Colegiala (1963; story)
Ang Daigdig Ko'y Ikaw (1965; written by)
The Jukebox Queen (1966; story)

References

External links

1924 births
1968 deaths
Filipino male film actors
Filipino film directors
20th-century Filipino male actors
Filipino male comedians
Filipino people of Spanish descent
Efren Senior
20th-century comedians
Burials at the Loyola Memorial Park